Sai Kumar or Saikumar is the name of:

 Sai Kumar (Malayalam actor) (born 1963), Indian actor in Malayalam language films
 P. Sai Kumar (born 1960), Indian actor in Telugu, Tamil, and Kannada language films